Maella is a municipality located in the province of Zaragoza, Aragon, Spain. According to the 2015 census (INE), the municipality has a population of 1,953 inhabitants. This town is located in La Franja, the local dialect is a variant of Catalan.

History

The Battle of Maella took place here in 1838. Historically this town and its municipal term were considered part of the Matarraña, but presently it is included in the Bajo Aragón-Caspe/Baix Aragó-Casp comarca. The sculptor Pablo Gargallo was born here in 1881.

See also
Trapa de Santa Susana
Matarraña/Matarranya
La Franja

References

External links

Municipalities in the Province of Zaragoza
La Franja